Look Around is a compilation album by indie rock band Beat Happening, released on 20 November 2015. The album is touted as a "career-spanning double album anthology", with track selections picked by the band.

Background
The album was released as a double LP, CD, cassette, and a deluxe LP version with a bonus 7" of "Indian Summer" and "Foggy Eyes" on yellow vinyl.

Reception

In a review for AllMusic, Tim Sendra wrote, "between Johnson's deadpan vocal delivery, his lovingly crafted persona, and his creepy and humorous lyrics, Lewis' less theatrical, open-hearted singing and writing, and Lunsford's steady musicianship, the band formed the kind of complementary bond most bands would kill to have. Their pieces fit together perfectly and their songs are short bursts of pop music that at their best come as close to perfection as anybody's ever have". Pitchforks Brandon Stosuy called the curation "perfect" and "a great primer" with "no major oversights or head-scratching inclusions".

Track listing
Adapted from CD release.

Personnel
Adapted from LP liner notes:
Bret Lunsford – performer
Calvin Johnson – performer
Heather Lewis – performer

References

External links

2015 compilation albums
Beat Happening albums